Long Mott is an unincorporated community in western Calhoun County, Texas, United States, located south of the junction of State Highway 185 and Farm to Market Road 2235. It is part of the Victoria, Texas Metropolitan Statistical Area.

References

Unincorporated communities in Calhoun County, Texas
Victoria, Texas metropolitan area
Unincorporated communities in Texas